Bathsheba ( or ; , Baṯ-šeḇaʿ, Bat-Sheva or Batsheva,  "daughter of Sheba" or "daughter of the oath") was the wife of Uriah the Hittite and later of David, according to the Hebrew Bible. She was the mother of Solomon, who succeeded David as king, making her the Gebirah (Queen mother). She is best known for the Biblical narrative in which she was summoned by King David, who had seen her bathing and lusted after her.

Biblical narrative

Bathsheba was the daughter of Eliam (Ammiel in ). Bathsheba was the wife of Uriah the Hittite.

David, while walking on the roof of his palace, saw a very beautiful woman bathing. He ordered enquiries and found out that she was Bathsheba, wife of Uriah. He desired her and later made her pregnant. David and Diana Garland regard David's action on Bathsheba as an example of rape in the Hebrew Bible.

In an effort to conceal his sin, David summoned Uriah from the army (with whom he was on campaign) in the hope that Uriah would have sex with her and think that the child belonged to him. But Uriah was unwilling to violate the ancient kingdom rule applying to warriors in active service. Rather than go home to his own bed, he preferred to remain with the palace troops.

After repeated efforts to convince Uriah to have sexual intercourse with Bathsheba failed, king David gave the order to his general, Joab, that Uriah should be placed on the front lines of the battle, where Uriah would be more likely to die. David had Uriah himself carry the message that led to his death (2 Samuel 11:6–15). After Uriah had been killed in the siege of Rabbah (2 Samuel 11:17), Bathsheba mourned Uriah, but then David took Bathsheba into his house and made her his wife, and she gave birth (2 Samuel 11:26–27).

David's action was displeasing to the Israelite god Yahweh ('the Lord'), who sent Nathan the prophet to reprove the king. After relating the parable of the rich man who took away the one little ewe lamb of his poor neighbor, and exciting the king's anger against the unrighteous act, the prophet applied the case directly to David's action with regard to Bathsheba. Nathan noted that Yahweh would punish David's house for Uriah's murder and taking his wife, and would let someone close (רֵעַ rea) to David take away / seize (לָקַח laqach) all his wives and have him lie with / rape (שָׁכַב šākab) them in broad daylight for everyone to see (2 Samuel 12:9–12). King David at once confessed his sin and expressed sincere repentance. Shortly after Bathsheba's first (unnamed) child by David was born, Yahweh struck it with a severe illness (2 Samuel 12:15). David pleaded with God to spare his child, fasting and spending the nights lying in sackcloth on the ground (2 Samuel 12:16–17), but after seven days the child died (2 Samuel 12:18). King David accepted this as his punishment, went to the house of Yahweh and worshipped him (2 Samuel 12:20–23).

Bathsheba later gave birth to David's son Solomon. In David's old age, Bathsheba, based on David's promise, secured the succession to the throne by Solomon, instead of David's elder surviving sons by his other wives, such as Chileab, Adonijah and others. David's punishment came to pass years later when one of David's much-loved sons, Absalom, led an insurrection that plunged the kingdom into civil war. Moreover, to manifest his claim to be the new king, Absalom had sexual intercourse in public with ten of his father's concubines, which could be considered a direct, tenfold divine retribution for David's taking the woman of another man in secret.

Judaism

Relationship to Ahithophel 
 
Several scholars see Bathsheba as the granddaughter of Ahitophel, as do passages in the Talmud. The argument is that she is called the daughter of Eliam in 2 Sam. 11:3, and 2 Sam 23:34 mentions an Eliam, the son of Ahithophel the Gilonite, one of David's "thirty". The assumption is then that these two Eliams are the same person.

However, in 1 Chronicles the names are very different: Bathsheba is called Bathshua the daughter of Ammiel in 1 Chronicles 3:5. And in the list of David's thirty in 1 Chronicles 11:36 we have Ahijah the Pelonite. Some have also questioned whether Ahithophel would have been old enough to have a granddaughter.

In rabbinic literature 
Bathsheba was the granddaughter of Ahithophel, David's famous counselor. The Aggadah states that Ahithophel was misled by his knowledge of astrology into believing himself destined to become king of Israel. He therefore induced Absalom to commit an unpardonable crime, which sooner or later would have brought with it, according to Jewish law, the penalty of death; the motive for this advice being to remove Absalom, and thus to make a way for himself to the throne. His astrological information had been, however, misunderstood by him; for in reality it only predicted that his granddaughter, Bathsheba, the daughter of his son Eliam, would become queen.

The Midrash portrays the influence of Satan bringing about the sinful relation of David and Bathsheba as follows: Bathsheba was bathing, perhaps behind a screen of wickerwork. Satan is depicted as coming in the disguise of a bird. David, shooting at the bird, strikes the screen, splitting it; thus Bathsheba is revealed in her beauty to David.

Christianity 
In , "the wife of Uriah" is mentioned as one of the ancestors of Jesus.

In medieval typology, Bathsheba is recognized as the antetype foreshadowing the role of Ecclesia, the church personified, as David was the antetype for Jesus. As a queen and mother, she was also associated with the Blessed Virgin Mary as Queen of Heaven. Bathsheba's son, King Solomon, rises to greet her, bows down in veneration, and furnishes her a seat at his right hand. This demonstrates her exalted status and share in the royal kingdom. Bathsheba acts as intercessor for her subjects, delivering their petitions to the King: "Pray ask King Solomon—he will not refuse you—to give me Abishag the Shunammite as my wife".

Bathsheba (Barsabeh, Bathsabeh) is venerated in Ethiopian Orthodox Tewahedo Church as a saint. Her feast day is 27 November (01 Tahsas).

Islam 
In Islam, David is considered to be a prophet, and some Islamic tradition views the Bible story as incompatible with the principle of infallibility (Ismah) of the prophets. A hadith quoted in Tafsir al-Kabir and Majma' al-Bayan expresses that Ali ibn Abi Talib said: "Whoever says that David, has married Uriah's wife as the legends are narrate, I will punish him twice: one for qazf (falsely accusing someone of adultery) and the other for desecrating the prophethood (defamation of prophet David)".

Another hadith narrated from Shia scholars states that Ali Al-Ridha, during the discussions with the scholars of other religions about prophets' infallibility, asked one of them, "What do you say about David?" he said "David was praying, when a beautiful bird appeared in front of him, and David left his prayer and went after the bird. While David was walking on the roof of his palace, he saw Bathsheba having a bath... so David placed her husband in the front lines of the battlefield, in order to get killed, so that he could marry Bathsheba." Ali Al-Ridha got upset and said: "Inna Lillahi wa inna ilaihi raji'un, you assign sluggishness in prayer to the prophet of God, and then accuse him of unchastity, and then charge him with the murder of an innocent man!"
He asked "so what is the story of Uriah?" and Ali Al-Ridha said "At that time, women whose husbands passed away or got killed in the war would never get married again (and this was the source of many evils). David was the first person to break this tradition. So after Uriah was incidentally killed in the war, David married his wife, but people could hardly accept this anomalous marriage (and subsequently legends were made about this marriage.)

Critical commentary 

Bathsheba's name appears in  spelled "Bath-shua", the form becomes merely a variant reading of "Bath-sheba". The material contained in it is of higher historical value than that in the later strata of these books. Budde later connected it with the Jahwist document of the Hexateuch.

The only interpolations that concern the story of Bathsheba are some verses in the early part of the twelfth chapter, that heighten the moral tone of Nathan's rebuke of David. According to Karl Budde the interpolated portion is 12: 7, 8, and 10–12; according to Friedrich Schwally and H. P. Smith, the whole of 12: 1–15a is an interpolation, and 12:. 15b should be joined directly to 11: 27. This does not directly affect the narrative concerning Bathsheba herself. 1 Chronicles omits all reference to the way in which Bathsheba became David's wife, and gives only the names of her children in —Shimea, Shobab, Nathan, and Solomon.

The father of Bathsheba was Eliam ("Ammiel" in ). As this was also the name of a son of Ahithophel, one of David's heroes, perhaps Bathsheba was a granddaughter of Ahithophel and that the latter's desertion of David at the time of Absalom's rebellion was in revenge for David's conduct toward Bathsheba.

Kenneth E. Bailey interprets the passage from a different perspective: he says that David's Jerusalem was tightly packed and Bathsheba's house may have been as close as twenty feet away from David's rooftop; people in ancient times were exceptionally modest about their bodies, so he suggests that Bathsheba displayed herself deliberately, so that instead of being an innocent victim, it was actually she who seduced David in order to rid herself of Uriah, and move in with King David.

David summoned Bathsheba for sex. Lawrence O. Richards states that the biblical text supports the innocence of Bathsheba, that David took the initiative to find out her identity and summon her, and that she was alone at the time and had no way to refuse the requests of a King. David J. Zucker writes that "[s]he is a victim of 'power rape'". Andrew J. Schmutzer stated that "David's 'taking' Bathsheba makes him responsible for her coming to him." Antony F. Campbell states "The 'violation of Bathsheba' may be the least unsatisfactory terminology, especially given the ambivalence of the text's storytelling." According to Michael D. Coogan, the faulting of David is made clear in the text from the very beginning: "It was springtime, the time when kings go forth to war... but David remained in Jerusalem"; if David had been away at war, the incident would not have taken place.

The Bathsheba incident leads to a shift in the book's perspective; afterwards David "is largely at the mercy of events rather than directing them". He is no longer able to control his family, and ends up being overthrown by Absalom. And in  the story of David's son Amnon's rape of his sister Tamar, told so soon after the incident of Bathsheba, seems to draw a parallel between the sexual misconduct of father and son.

Cultural references

Art – Bathsheba in her bath

Along with Eve, Bathsheba was almost the only female whose nude depiction could easily and regularly be justified in Christian art, and she is therefore an important figure in the development of the nude in medieval art.  Though sometimes shown clothed at other points in her story, the most common depiction, in both medieval and later art, was Bathsheba at her Bath, the formal name for the subject in art showing Bathsheba bathing, watched by King David. This could be shown with various degrees of nudity, depending on the pose and the placing of clothes or towels. One of the most common placements in the 15th century, perhaps surprisingly, was in miniatures illustrating a book of hours, a personal prayer book, that overtook the psalter as the most popular devotional book for laypeople.  This was especially the case in France.

In art the subject is one of the most commonly shown in the Power of Women topos. As an opportunity to feature a large female nude as the focus of a history painting, the subject was popular from the Renaissance onwards. Sometimes Bathsheba's maids or the "messengers" sent by David are shown, and often a distant David watching from his roof. The messengers are sometimes confused with David himself, but most artists follow the Bible in keeping David at a distance in this episode.

Paintings with articles include:
Bathsheba, Hans Memling, c. 1480 
Bathsheba at Her Bath (Rembrandt), Louvre, the most famous painting of the subject.
Bathsheba at her Bath (Veronese), 1575, Musée des Beaux-Arts de Lyon, France. Atypically, Bathsheba is clothed in this.
 Bathsheba (painting), Artemisia Gentileschi (and Viviano Codazzi, Domenico Gargiulo, 1637
 Bathsheba at her Bath (Ricci), 1720s, Museum of Fine Arts, Budapest
Bathsheba at the Fountain, Rubens, c. 1635. Bathsheba receives David's letter

Literature
 1588 David and Bethsabe, a play by George Peele
 1874 The story of Bathsheba, David and Uriah is echoed in Thomas Hardy's novel Far from the Madding Crowd.
 1893 The Sherlock Holmes story The Adventure of the Crooked Man uses the David/Bathsheba story as its main structure.
 1984 The tragicomedic novel God Knows written by Joseph Heller. Narrated by king David, purports to be his deathbed memoirs; however, not recounted in a straightforward fashion, the storyline is often hilariously fractured, exploring David's childhood herding sheep, the prophet Samuel, Goliath, King Saul, Jonathan (and homosexual innuendoes), Bathsheba and Uriah, the Psalms, the treachery of Absalom, Solomon, with even the occasional display of David betraying a knowledge of the future and Heaven. 
 2000 The biblical commentary anthology Really Bad Girls of the Bible by Liz Curtis Higgs contains a contemporary-setting story based on the first part of 2 Samuel 11, then discusses the biblical story in the following commentary segment.
 2011 Jill Eileen Smith's Bathsheba: A Novel (The Wives of King David),
 2015 The life of King David, as narrated by the prophet Nathan, and including the story of Uriah and Bathsheba, is the subject of the novel The Secret Chord by Geraldine Brooks.
2015 Angela Hunt's Bathsheba: Reluctant Beauty (A Dangerous Beauty Novel)
 2018 Jenifer Jennings's A Stolen Wife
 2020 Elizabeth Cook's novel Lux compares David and Bathsheba to Henry VIII and Anne Boleyn though the eyes of Thomas Wyatt.
2022 Amanda Bedzrah's novel Becoming Queen Bathsheba

Film
Bathsheba has been portrayed by:
 Susan Hayward in the 1951 film David and Bathsheba
 Rosalind Elias in the TV premier of Ezra Laderman's opera/cantata And David Wept (1971) 
 Jane Seymour in the 1976 TV film The Story of David (1976).
 Alice Krige in the 1985 film King David
 Melia Kreiling in the 2013 TV miniseries The Bible.

Musical
 David, and Bathsheba (who is unnamed), are referenced, in the Leonard Cohen song "Hallelujah" (released 1985) ("you saw her bathing on the roof, her beauty in the moonlight overthrew you").
 The song "Dead" from the 1989 album Doolittle by the Pixies depicts David's lust for Bathsheba, the pregnancy resulting from their adultery, and Uriah's demise. Bathsheba and Uriah are mentioned by name.
 "Mad About You", a song on Sting's 1991 album The Soul Cages, explores David's obsession with Bathsheba from David's perspective
 "David and Bethsheba" from the Brown Bird album Bottom of the Sea is a retelling of the story from David's perspective.

See also
 King Lemuel, perhaps connected to Bathsheba
 Susanna (Book of Daniel), also spied on while bathing

References

Citations

Sources

Bibliography

 Kristin De Troyer, "Looking at Bathsheba with Text-Critical Eyes," in Nóra Dávid, Armin Lange, Kristin De Troyer and Shani Tzoref (eds), The Hebrew Bible in Light of the Dead Sea Scrolls (Göttingen, Vandenhoeck & Ruprecht, 2011) (Forschungen zur Religion und Literatur des Alten und Neuen Testaments, 239), 84–94.

External links 

Askmoses.com , "Was King David guilty of murder and adultery?" by Rabbis Mendy Gutnick and Avrohom Wineberg

11th-century BCE Hebrew people
10th-century BCE Hebrew people
10th-century BC women
11th-century BC women
Biblical figures in rabbinic literature
Mythological rape victims
Iconography
Jewish royalty
Solomon
Queens consort of Israel and Judah
Queen mothers
Wives of David
11th-century BC people
Ethiopian saints
Christian royal saints
Biblical matriarchs
Women in the Hebrew Bible
Christian saints in unknown century
Saints
Christian saints from the Old Testament